Kur Bolagh-e Sofla may refer to:
Kur Bolagh-e Yek
Patiabad, Kermanshah